Tower Hill station may refer to:
 Tower Hill station (Staten Island Railway), a rapid transit station on the Staten Island Railway
 Tower Hill tube station, a tube station in London